is a passenger railway station located in the city of Akashi, Hyōgo Prefecture, Japan, operated by the private Sanyo Electric Railway.

Lines

Station layout
The station consists of two unnumbered elevated side platforms with the station building underneath.

Platforms

Adjacent stations

|-
!colspan=5|Sanyo Electric Railway

History
Nishi-Futami Station opened on August 21, 2004.

Passenger statistics
In fiscal 2018, the station was used by an average of 2,934 passengers daily (boarding passengers only).

Surrounding area
 Akashi City Western Cultural Center
 Nishifutami Community Center
Akashi City Kaminishi Welfare Hall
Futami Central Park

See also
List of railway stations in Japan

References

External links

  Official website (Sanyo Electric Railway) 

Railway stations in Japan opened in 2004
Railway stations in Hyōgo Prefecture
Akashi, Hyōgo